The Fletcher Covered Bridge is a  Multiple King Post covered bridge located near Marshville in Harrison County, West Virginia.  The bridge crosses Tenmile Creek is West Virginia bridge number 48-17-03.  Stones for the abutments were quarried at the top of a hill near the bridge site.  The original building cost was $1,372.  
 The Fletcher Covered Bridge is one of only two covered bridges still standing in Harrison County, the other is the Simpson Creek Covered Bridge.  This bridge is in regular use today.

Location
Fletcher Covered Bridge is located on Marshville Road 1.6 miles past the intersection with US Route 50.

Upgrades
Under a $447,000 contract, Allegheny Restoration and Builders, Inc. of Morgantown restored the Fletcher Covered Bridge, including detouring local traffic while structural timber was replaced and new siding and a metal roof were installed.

See also
List of West Virginia covered bridges
History.com

References

External links
http://www.nationalregisterofhistoricplaces.com/wv/Harrison/state.html
https://web.archive.org/web/20081029003913/http://users.hrea.coop/post/fletcher.html
http://www.waymarking.com/waymarks/WM21H6

Buildings and structures in Harrison County, West Virginia
Transportation in Harrison County, West Virginia
Tourist attractions in Harrison County, West Virginia
Bridges completed in 1891
Covered bridges on the National Register of Historic Places in West Virginia
Wooden bridges in West Virginia
National Register of Historic Places in Harrison County, West Virginia
1891 establishments in West Virginia
Road bridges on the National Register of Historic Places in West Virginia
King post truss bridges in the United States